Platycheirus occultus is a Palearctic species of hoverfly.

Description
External images
For terms see Morphology of Diptera Tarsae 1: apical half of all segments without dark brown to black blotches ventrally. Femora 1 black to dark brown for less than half its length. Surstyli pale-haired.

Distribution
Norway, Sweden, Finland, Denmark, Ireland, Britain, North Germany, France Switzerland, Spain and northern Italy (Apennines), Serbia, Turkey

Biology
Habitat: fen and bog, coastal marsh and dune slacks, humid, seasonally-flooded, grassland, moorland, taiga wetlands. Flies April to September.

References

Diptera of Europe
Syrphinae
Insects described in 1990